The 1973 NAIA Division II football season was the 18th season of college football sponsored by the NAIA and the fourth season of play of the NAIA's lower division for football.

The season was played from August to November 1973 and culminated in the 1973 NAIA Division II Football National Championship, played on December 8, 1973 in Huntington, West Virginia near the campus of Glenville State College.

The Northwestern Red Raiders defeated .  in the championship game, 10–3, to win their first NAIA national title. As of 2015, this is the earliest NAIA championship won by a team that remains at the NAIA level.

Conference standings

Postseason

See also
 1973 NAIA Division I football season
 1973 NCAA Division I football season
 1973 NCAA Division II football season
 1973 NCAA Division III football season

References

 
NAIA Football National Championship